St. Elsewhere is the debut album by American soul duo Gnarls Barkley. It was released on April 24, 2006 in the UK, where it debuted at number one on the UK Albums Chart, and on May 9, 2006 in the United States, although it was available for purchase one week earlier as a digital download in the US iTunes Store. It debuted at No. 20 on the US Billboard 200, and peaked at No. 4. It topped the Billboard Dance/Electronic Albums chart for 39 non-consecutive weeks in 2006 and 2007. The album's first single, "Crazy", was the first song to become a UK number-one single based solely on downloads. The album was certified Platinum in the US by the RIAA, for shipping 1,000,000 units. A limited edition deluxe package of St. Elsewhere was released on November 7. The CD + DVD package includes a 92-page booklet, four music videos, and bonus songs from live performances. It was also released on vinyl.

Background

The group created an elaborate backstory for the "Gnarls Barkley" persona, claiming to be close friends of Lester Bangs, Isaac Hayes, Gordon Gano, and lovers of Janet Jackson and Mariah Carey. The character taught the band Kraftwerk English, as well as set up a meeting between the group Wu-Tang Clan and members of the Stuckist art movement. In promotional photographs, the group wears costumes similar to the character Alex from A Clockwork Orange.

Composition
In an interview with New York, Gnarls Barkley were asked if they intended to make a contemporary psychedelic record with St. Elsewhere. Producer Danger Mouse agreed, wishing to fuse melody with experimentation like late-1960s music he admired. Indeed, Elsewhere sees Cee-lo Green's neo soul style set against Mouse's psychedelic rock / soul-infused music.

"Creepy-crawly" hip hop also features, yielding a "big [and] amorphous" take on the genre.

Critical reception and awards

The album received general acclaim from critics: At Metacritic, which assigns a normalized rating out of 100 to reviews from mainstream critics, the album received an average score of 81 out of 100, which indicates "universal acclaim", based on 37 reviews. It was rated the best release of 2006 by PopMatters. In 2007, the album won the Grammy Award for Best Alternative Music Album, with nominations for Album of the Year and Record of the Year for "Crazy". St. Elsewhere placed on Slant Magazines list of best albums of the 2000s at number 92.

Track listing
All tracks are produced by Danger Mouse.

Sample credits
  "Go-Go Gadget Gospel" contains samples from "Goin Down to Freedom's Land", written and performed by Nicolas Flagello.
  "Crazy" incorporates elements and samples of "Last Man Standing", written and performed by Gian Franco Reverberi and Gian Piero Reverberi.
  "St. Elsewhere" incorporates elements of "Geordie", arranged by Barry Clarke, David Costa, Celia Humphris, and Stephen Brown, and performed by Trees.
  "The Boogie Monster" incorporates elements and samples of "Ku Klux Klan Sequence", written and performed by Armando Trovaioli and Angelo Francesco Lavagnino.
  "Feng Shui" incorporates elements and samples of "Tropical", written and performed by Nino Nardini.
  "Just a Thought" incorporates elements of "A Touch of Class", written and performed by Kevin Peek.
  "Transformer" incorporates elements of "Rubber Solution", written by Marlene Moore and performed by Lee Mason.
  "Who Cares?" incorporates elements of "Mono Ski", written and performed by Keith Mansfield.
  "The Last Time" incorporates elements and samples of "Chicano Chaser", written and performed by Ian Langley.

Personnel
Credits adapted from the album's liner notes.

Gnarls Barkley
 Danger Mouse – production, mixing
 Cee-Lo Green – vocals

Additional musicians

 Ced Keys International – piano , synthesizers 
 Daniele Luppi – arrangements , organ , synth bass , Minimoog , orchestration 
 David Piltch – additional bass guitar , bass guitar 
 Ben H. Allen – guitar , bass guitar 
 Dr. President – keyboards , bass guitar , organs , guitars 
 Tomika Walden – background vocals 
 Menta Malone – background vocals 
 Eddie Reyes – acoustic guitar 
 Chris Tedesco – trumpets 
 Eric Bobo – drums 

Technical
 Ben H. Allen – mixing, engineering
 Kennie Takahashi – mix engineering
 Mike Lazer – mastering
 Mark "Exit" Goodchild – additional engineering 

Artwork
 Tom Hingston – art direction
 Kam Tang – illustration
 Alex Kirzhner – design

Samples
Taken from the St. Elsewhere liner notes:

"Go-Go Gadget Gospel" contains samples from "Goin' Down to Freedom's Land" written and performed by Nicolas Flagello.
"Crazy" incorporates elements of "Last Man Standing" written and performed by Gian Franco Reverberi and co-written by Gian Piero Reverberi.
"St. Elsewhere" incorporates elements of "Geordie" performed by Trees and arranged by Barry Clarke, David Costa, Celia Humphris and Stephen Brown.
"The Boogie Monster" incorporates elements of "Ku Klux Klan Sequence" written and performed by Armando Trovaioli and Angelo Francesco Lavagnino.
"Feng Shui" incorporates elements of "Tropicola" written and performed by Nino Nardini.
"Just a Thought" incorporates elements of "A Touch of Class" written and performed by Kevin Peek.
"Transformer" incorporates elements of "Rubber Solution" written by Marlene Moore.
"Who Cares?" incorporates elements of "Mono Ski" written and performed by Keith Mansfield.
"Online" incorporates elements of "Welcome to the Rain" written by Flip Davis and performed by Mid Day Rain.
"The Last Time" incorporates elements of "Chicano Chaser" written and performed by Ian Langley.

Charts

Weekly charts

Year-end charts

Decade-end charts

Certifications

References

2006 debut albums
Albums produced by Danger Mouse (musician)
Gnarls Barkley albums
Grammy Award for Best Alternative Music Album